Transcendence (stylized as TRANSCENDENCE) is the debut studio album by Pakistani rapper-producer Adil Omar. It was released independently on July 8, 2018 with a film of the same title to accompany it.

The visual album was also directed by Adil Omar. The album was recorded in 2017 in Islamabad and features Elliphant, SNKM, Talal Qureshi and Tim Armstrong of Rancid. The album also included recreations of 1970's and 80's era Lollywood soundtracks, but rather than relying on sampling, Omar reached out to some of the original creators such as Ustad Tafu and M. Arshad and hosted live sessions in his home studio Bisonopolis, Islamabad.

The instrumental version of the album was released on October 8, 2018.

Track listing

Personnel 
 Adil Omar - rapping, songwriting, production, vocals, lyrics, keyboards, mixing, mastering, engineering: all tracks
 Talal Qureshi - co-production, keyboards: track 6, 8 and 9; mixing, engineering: track 2; guest vocals: track 9
 Shamoon Ismail - co-production: track 3
 Ustad Tafu - harmonium, tabla: track 6; additional arrangement, percussion: track 8
 Tim Armstrong - guitars: track 10
 Ellinor Olovsdotter - guest vocals, lyrics: track 9
 Hannu "KFied" Makela: co-production, guitar: track 10
 M. Arshad - additional arrangement: tracks 1, 2, 4, 5, 7, 9
 Durran Amin - additional keyboards: tracks 1, 2, 3, 4, 5, 6, 7, 8, 10
 Ali Haider Tipu - additional keyboards: tracks 1, 2, 4, 5, 6, 7, 9
 Saim "Psyme" Salahuddin - guitars: tracks 1, 5, 7, 9
 Zain Ali - guitars: track 5
 Durek Verrett - guest vocals, lyrics: track 9; additional vocals: track 7
 Seth Drake - mastering: all tracks
 Nicki Adamsson - engineering, vocal mixing: track 9
 Komail Aijazuddin - album artwork

Interpolations 
"Transcendence" contains an interpolation of "O My Love I Promise You" by M. Ashraf featuring Nahid Akhtar, from the 1977 film Sham-e-Mohabbat
"Champions" contains an interpolation of "Cocktail" by M. Arshad, from the 1990 self titled album M. Arshad
"The Observer" contains interpolations of "I Am Very Sorry" by Kamal Ahmed featuring Noor Jehan, from the 1976 film Warrant, and "Dil Kare Kukrroo Karroo" by M. Arshad (1990)
"Testosterone Tears" contains an interpolation of "Main Hoon Play Boy" by M. Ashraf featuring A. Nayyar, from the 1978 film Playboy
"We Need to Talk About Adil" contains an interpolation of "Kad Ley Way" by Ustad Tafu featuring Nahid Akhtar, from the 1976 film Aj Da Badmash
"The Void" contains an interpolation of "Life Hai Kuch Dinon Ki" by M. Ashraf featuring Nahid Akhtar, from the 1978 film Playboy
"Discovery" contains an interpolation of "Na Main Chini Na Japani" by Ustad Tafu featuring Nahid Akhtar, from the 1980 film Des Pardes
"Revelations" contains an interpolation of "Disco Deewani Mera Naam" by M. Ashraf and Nahid Akhtar, from the 1983 film Eik Din Bahu Ka

References 

2018 debut albums
Adil Omar albums
Concept albums